Portobello is an area in Willenhall on the Wolverhampton side of the border, in the West Midlands, England.  It is situated to the east of the city centre and to the north of Bilston, in the Bilston North ward of the city council.  It was formerly part of Willenhall Urban District before Willenhall was split between Walsall and Wolverhampton.

While the railway line through Portobello remains open, the nearest station is Wolverhampton. When reopened, the nearest will be Willenhall.   The main bus routes are services 529 and X529, the latter being limited stop.  In addition Diamond Bus 326 links Portobello with Bilston and Bloxwich. 

Tall blocks of flats and shops in the area were at one point demolished. In 2018, the area began redevelopment, and an Aldi supermarket opposite the new housing development opened in December 2019.

Areas of Wolverhampton